Worcester railway station can refer to several different stations:

In the United Kingdom
Worcester Foregate Street railway station in the centre of Worcester
Worcester Shrub Hill railway station to the east of Worcester city centre
Worcester Park railway station in Worcester Park, south-west London
Worcestershire Parkway railway station, about a mile outside of Worcester near the village of Norton

In the United States
Union Station (Worcester, Massachusetts)